Orson Bean (born Dallas Frederick Burrows; July 22, 1928 – February 7, 2020) was an American film, television, and stage actor, comedian, writer, and producer.  He was a game show and talk show host and a "mainstay of Los Angeles’ small theater scene." He appeared frequently on several televised game shows from the 1960s through the 1980s and was a longtime panelist on the television game show To Tell the Truth. "A storyteller par excellence", he was a favorite of Johnny Carson, appearing on The Tonight Show more than 200 times.

In the 1960s, Bean remarked in an interview that he became known as a "neocelebrity who's famous for being famous" for his appearances as a panellist on television prime-time gameshows.

Early life
Orson Bean was born in Burlington, Vermont, in 1928, while his first cousin twice removed, Calvin Coolidge, was President of the United States. Bean was the son of Marian Ainsworth (née Pollard) and George Frederick Burrows. His father was a founding member of the American Civil Liberties Union (ACLU), a fund-raiser for the Scottsboro Boys' defense, and a 20-year member of the campus police of Harvard College. Bean said his house was "full of causes". He left home at 16 after his mother died by suicide.

Bean graduated from Rindge Technical School in Cambridge, Massachusetts, in 1946. He then joined the United States Army and was stationed in Japan for a year. Following his military service, Bean began working in small venues as a stage magician before moving in the early 1950s to stand-up comedy. He studied theatre at HB Studio.

Stage name
In an interview on The Tonight Show Starring Johnny Carson in 1974, Bean recounted the source of his stage name. He credited its origin to a piano player named Val at "Hurley's Log Cabin", a restaurant and nightclub in Boston where he had once performed. According to Bean, every evening before he went on stage at the nightclub, Val would suggest to him a silly name to use when introducing himself to the audience. One night, for example, the piano player suggested "Roger Duck," but the young comedian got very few laughs after using that name in his performance. On another night, the musician suggested "Orson Bean" and the comedian received a great response from the audience, a reaction so favorable that it resulted in a job offer that same evening from a local theatrical booking agent. Given his success on that occasion, Bean decided to keep using the odd-sounding but memorable name. (Bean again told the story nearly verbatim on the Carson show September 23, 1976, but Carson appeared to not remember having heard it before.) 

Bean claimed that his name was a blend of the pompous and the amusing. He recalled that Orson Welles once called him over to a table and said, "You stole my name," and then dismissed him with a wave.

Rising comedian
In 1952, Bean made a guest appearance on NBC Radio's weekly hot-jazz series The Chamber Music Society of Lower Basin Street, giving the young comic his first national exposure. The series, burlesquing stuffy symphonic and operatic broadcasts, had the host (always introduced as a doctor of music) reciting dignified commentary in jazz-musician slang. NBC had broadcast the series off and on since 1940, and it was revived for a 13-week run with "Dr. Orson Bean" now as full-time host. Bean's august, bemused delivery belied the fact that this eminent professor was only 24 years old.

For 10 years, he was the house comic at New York's Blue Angel comedy club. In 1954, The New York Times noted in a review of The Blue Angel, Bean's delivery was always well played, even if a joke fell flat. He once hosted a television show, "Blue Angel", on CBS. He "maintained a steady career since the 1950s and cut his teeth on and off Broadway before becoming a live-television staple."

Temporary eclipse
Bean was placed on the Hollywood blacklist for attending Communist Party meetings while dating a member, but continued to work through the 1950s and 1960s. "Basically I was blacklisted because I had a cute communist girlfriend," he said in a 2001 interview. He only stopped working in television for a year. An appearance on The Ed Sullivan Show was cancelled due to his being on the blacklist and he was rendered persona non grata there for years because of it. Sullivan eventually relented and re-booked him, declaring that he was the master of his own show, not "Campbell's Soup."

Theatre
On Broadway Bean starred in the original cast of Will Success Spoil Rock Hunter? with Walter Matthau and Jayne Mansfield. Then, in 1961, he was featured in Subways Are for Sleeping with Sydney Chaplin, for which he received a Tony Award nomination as Best Featured Actor in a Musical. Bean performed in Never Too Late the following year. In 1964, he produced the Off-Off-Broadway musical Home Movies — which won an Obie Award.  And the same year, he appeared in the Broadway production I Was Dancing.  Bean starred in the musical John Murray Anderson’s Almanac.  He also voiced and sang the role of Charlie Brown on MGM's original 1966 concept album of the musical You're a Good Man, Charlie Brown, and starred in Illya Darling, the 1967 musical adaptation of the film Never on Sunday.

He was a chief creator and "mainstay" of The Pacific Resident Theatre in Venice, California.

Television 
Bean played the title character in the Twilight Zone episode "Mr. Bevis" (1960) that was an unsuccessful television pilot. For the CBS anthology series The DuPont Show with June Allyson, he starred as John Monroe in "The Country Mouse" (1961), based on the works of the American humorist James Thurber, an episode which was later developed into the series My World and Welcome to It on NBC, starring William Windom in the Monroe role.

Among dozens of appearances, Bean starred in Dr. Quinn, Medicine Woman, and Desperate Housewives while tallying guest appearance credits on programs such as How I Met Your Mother, Modern Family, Two and a Half Men, and The Closer.  Bean was a regular in both Mary Hartman, Mary Hartman and its spin-off Fernwood 2Nite. He also portrayed the shrewd businessman and storekeeper Loren Bray on the television series Dr. Quinn, Medicine Woman throughout its six-year run on CBS in the 1990s. He played the main characters Bilbo and Frodo Baggins in the 1977 and 1980 Rankin/Bass animated adaptations of J.R.R. Tolkien's The Hobbit, and The Return of the King. In 2000, he appeared in the Will & Grace episode "There But For the Grace of Grace" as Will Truman and Grace Adler's old college professor. He also appeared in the short-lived ABC sitcom Normal, Ohio as the homophobic father of a gay man (played by John Goodman).

Bean appeared as a patient in the final two episodes of 7th Heavens seventh season in 2003. In 2005, Bean appeared in the sitcom Two and a Half Men in an episode titled "Does This Smell Funny to You?", playing a former playboy whose conquests included actresses Tuesday Weld and Anne Francis. He appeared in the 2007 How I Met Your Mother episode "Slapsgiving" as Robin Scherbatsky's 41-year-old boyfriend, Bob. In 2009 he was cast in the recurring role of Roy Bender, a steak salesman, who is Karen McCluskey's love interest on the ABC series Desperate Housewives. At the age of 87, Bean in 2016 appeared in "Playdates", an episode of the American TV sitcom Modern Family. He appeared in a 2017 episode of Teachers (TV Land, season 2, episode 11, "Dosey Don't"). In 2020, Bean appeared in the Netflix series Grace and Frankie, as the rascally character Bruno, a potential green card spouse for Joan-Margaret, in the episode "The Scent" (S6E10). It was Bean's final television performance.

Game shows 
Doing stand-up comedy and magic tricks, and passing on wit and wisdom, he became a regular on I've Got a Secret, What's My Line?, and To Tell the Truth. He appeared on game shows originating from New York. He was a regular panelist on To Tell the Truth in versions from the late 1950s through 1991. He appeared on Super Password and Match Game, among other game shows. He hosted a pilot for a revamped version of Concentration in 1985; it was not picked up, but elements carried over to Classic Concentration with Alex Trebek, primarily the theme, graphics and announcer Gene Wood.

Talk and variety shows 
A skilled raconteur, Bean was a popular guest on various television talk and variety shows, e.g., The Ed Sullivan Show, The Mike Douglas Show, and The Tonight Show (with both Jack Paar and Johnny Carson), where he made frequent appearances.

Film 
Bean played the eccentric, foul-mouthed Dr. Lester in Spike Jonze's 1999 film, Being John Malkovich. He also appeared as a Holocaust survivor in the 2018 film The Equalizer 2 and as Meg Ryan's editor in Joe Dante's 1987 film Innerspace.

Personal life
Bean was married three times. His first marriage was in 1956 to actress Jacqueline de Sibour, whose stage name was Rain Winslow. Sibour was the daughter of French nobleman and pilot Vicomte Jacques de Sibour and his wife Violette B. Selfridge (daughter of American-born British department-store magnate Harry Gordon Selfridge). Before their divorce in 1962, Bean and Jacqueline had one child, Michele.

In 1965, he married actress and fashion designer Carolyn Maxwell, with whom he had three children: Max, Susannah, and Ezekiel. The couple divorced in 1981. Their daughter Susannah was married to journalist Andrew Breitbart from 1997 until his death in 2012. In the early 1970s Bean took his family on a sabbatical break from New York to live briefly on a farm commune in Victoria, Australia.

Bean's third wife was The Wonder Years co-star Alley Mills. They married in 1993 and lived in Los Angeles until his death in 2020. When Mills was baptized as an adult, Bean walked with her down to the beach so "Pastor Ken" from First Lutheran Church of Venice could baptize her in the waters of the Pacific Ocean.  For many years, Bean and Mills played roles in First Lutheran's annual production of A Christmas Carol; Bean played Ebenezer Scrooge.

An admirer of Laurel and Hardy, Bean, in 1965, was a founding member of The Sons of the Desert. This international organization is devoted to sharing information about the lives of Stan Laurel and Oliver Hardy and preserving and enjoying their films.

In 1966, he helped found the 15th Street School in New York City, a primary school using the radical, democratic, free school Summerhill as a model. Bean wrote an autobiographical account about his life-changing experience with the orgone therapy developed by Austrian-born psychoanalyst Wilhelm Reich. Published in 1971, the account is titled Me and the Orgone: The True Story of One Man's Sexual Awakening.

He was a distant cousin of President Calvin Coolidge. In later life, "his politics turned more conservative" and he authored intermittent columns for Breitbart News. He ventured the thought that being a conservative in 21st-century Hollywood was much like being a suspected Communist back in the 1950s.

For much of his career and until his death, he was represented by the Artists & Representatives agency. In its brief statement after his death, they noted he was an "assiduous nurturer of rising talent."

Death
On February 7, 2020, while crossing Venice Boulevard in the Venice section of Los Angeles, Bean was struck by two vehicles, with the second vehicle striking him fatally. The driver of the first vehicle did not see Bean and "clipped him and he went down", said Los Angeles Police Department Captain Brian Wendling. "A second vehicle's driver was distracted by people trying to slow him down; when the driver looked ahead, a second traffic collision occurred and it caused the death of Bean".

Filmography

Film

Television

Awards and nominations

Books

Recordings
 At the Hungry i (1959 Fantasy UFAN 7009), comedy
 You're A Good Man, Charlie Brown (as Charlie Brown, 1966), comedy
 I Ate the Baloney (1969 Columbia CS 9743), comedy

References

External links

 
 
 
 
 
 
 

1928 births
2020 deaths
20th-century American male actors
21st-century American male actors
20th-century American comedians
21st-century American comedians
Accidental deaths in California
American autobiographers
American male film actors
American male stage actors
American male comedians
American television personalities
Male television personalities
American male television actors
American male musical theatre actors
Hollywood blacklist
Male actors from Vermont
Orgonomy
Writers from Burlington, Vermont
Comedians from Vermont
Military personnel from Vermont
Cambridge Rindge and Latin School alumni
Pedestrian road incident deaths
Road incident deaths in California
Coolidge family